Live at Some Prick's House is an EP by the American punk rock bands the Queers and the Pink Lincolns, released in 1994 by independent record label Just Add Water Records. A split release, it includes five songs recorded by the Queers during a June 1991 performance on the Massachusetts Institute of Technology's campus radio station WMBR, and three songs performed by the Pink Lincolns on Halloween 1993 at the Sombre Reptile in Atlanta, including a cover version of Bikini Kill's "Suck My Left One".

Reception
Reviewing the EP for AllMusic, critic Mike DaRonco rated it two stars out of five, remarking that "because all of the songs on this record can be found elsewhere with a better production—and in the case of the Queers side, they're available on their live album Suck This—Live at Some Prick's House is more for the dedicated fans of both of these bands."

Track listing
Writing credits adapted from the EP's liner notes and those of the Queers' A Day Late and a Dollar Short.

Personnel
Credits adapted from the EP's liner notes.

The Queers
 Joe Queer (Joe King) – lead vocals, guitar
 B-Face (Chris Barnard) – bass guitar, backing vocals, cover illustration
 Hugh O'Neill – drums

Pink Lincolns
 Chris Barrows – lead vocals
 Dorsey Martin – guitar
 Paul Johnston – guitar
 Jim Belogna – bass guitar
 Fred Stoltz – drums

Production
 Carl Plaster – producer and audio engineer of Queers tracks
 Jim Tierney – mastering of Queers tracks

Artwork
 Julie Rose – photographs of the Queers

References

1994 EPs